Haywards Bay is a suburb of the City of Wollongong to the south of Dapto.

References

Suburbs of Wollongong